Die rote Kapelle is a 1972 West German television mini series on the anti-Nazi resistance and espionage organization called "Red Orchestra" by the Gestapo.
The series was released one year after the East German film KLK an PTX - Die rote Kapelle on the very same subject.

See also
List of German television series

References

External links
 

1972 German television series debuts
1972 German television series endings
1970s French television series
1972 French television series debuts
1972 French television series endings
1970s Italian television series
1972 Italian television series debuts
1972 Italian television series endings
World War II television drama series
Espionage television series
Television series based on actual events
German-language television shows
Das Erste original programming
Films directed by Franz Peter Wirth